Zinc finger protein 165 is a protein that in humans is encoded by the ZNF165 gene.

Function 

This gene encodes a member of the Kruppel family of zinc finger proteins. Members of this DNA-binding protein family act as transcriptional regulators. This gene is located within a cluster of zinc finger family members. The encoded protein may play a role in spermatogenesis.

Interactions 

Zinc finger protein 165 has been shown to interact with Ewing sarcoma breakpoint region 1 and DVL2.

See also 
 Zinc finger

References

Further reading

External links 
 

Transcription factors